Expendables is a role-playing game published by Stellar Games in 1987.

Description
Expendables is a science-fiction space-adventure system. The PCs are "expendables," agents of an interstellar megacorporation, and their job is exploring newly discovered planets. The rules cover character creation, skills, combat, equipment, vehicles, the interstellar background, information for the GM, and planet and creature generation. Characters are one of six types of "specialists," each of which have different skill lists.

Publication history
Expendables was designed by L. Lee Cerny, Walter H. Mytczynskyj, and Michael A. Thomas, and published by Stellar Games in 1987 as an 88-page book.

Reception
Lawrence Schick notes that "Expendables is perhaps the only RPG with a specific skill listing for proctology."

Reviews
White Wolf Magazine (Issue 10 - 1988)
Challenge #42 (Feb./March, 1990)

References

Role-playing games introduced in 1987
Science fiction role-playing games